Tadachika (written: 忠周, 忠隣 or 忠親) is a masculine Japanese given name. Notable people with the name include:

, Japanese daimyō
, Japanese noble and writer
, Japanese daimyō

Japanese masculine given names